Albert Herring is a 1959 Australian television play based on Benjamin Britten's opera of the same name. It was broadcast live from Melbourne in 1959 but recorded on tape and repeated in 1960. Leading tenor Victor Franklin had appeared as King Kaspar in a televised production of Menotti's Amahl and the Night Visitors in 1957. Christopher Muir produced and  conducted the Victorian Symphony Orchestra.

Cast
Victor Franklin as Albert Herring
Kathleen Goodall as Lady Billows
Anne Levin as Nancy Waters
Lynette Martin as Harry
Keith Neilson as Superintendent of Police
Lorenzo Nolan as Mayor of Loxford
Nancy Rasmussen as Emmie
Justine Rettick as Mrs. Herring
Neil Warren-Smith as Sid
Wilma Whitney as Florence Pike
Barbara Wilson as Mrs. Wordsworth

See also
 List of live television plays broadcast on ABC (1956–1969)

References

External links
 
Albert Herring photos at National Archives of Australia

1950s Australian television plays
Australian television plays based on operas
1959 television plays